The second edition of the Bangladeshi music television series Coke Studio Bangla started airing from 14 February 2023. Like the previous season this season is also produced by Shayan Chowdhury Arnob and distributed by Coca-Cola Bangladesh. Spotify is the official music streaming partner of this season, and Grameenphone being their official teleco partner.

Featured artists 
The lineup showcases artists from different regions of Bangladesh.

Vocalists 

 Meghdol
 Mejbaur Rahman Sumon 
 Riad Hasan
 Pollob Vai
 Shibu Kumer Shill
 Towfique Ahmed

Backing Vocalists 

 Jannatul Firdous Akbar 
 Rubayat Rehman 
 Shanila Islam

Musicians 

 Double Bass: Mohaimin Karim 
 Drums: Mazruq Islam (Nafi) & Wadid Mahmood 
 Harmonica: Maesha Marium 
 Mandolin: Shuvendu Das Shuvo 
 Percussions: Mithun Charka & Md. Mobarak Hossain 
 Piano & Synth: Pradyut Chatterjea 
 Saxophone: Rahin Haider & Sayonton Mangsang 
 Trombone: Apurba Mustafa 
 Trumpet: Kabil Mia

Episodes 
All songs were produced by Shayan Chowdhury Arnob.

Notes and references

Notes

References 

Bangladeshi music television shows
Musical television series